The Pulau Enggano dwarf gecko (Hemiphyllodactylus engganoensis) is a species of gecko. It is endemic to Enggano Island, Indonesia.

References

Hemiphyllodactylus
Reptiles described in 2014
Reptiles of Indonesia
Endemic fauna of Indonesia